White Wall is a Finnish-Swedish television drama, mystery and sci-fi series Season 1 of which premiered on SVT1 in Sweden on September 20, 2020, and on YLE TV1 in Finland on November 15, 2020. It was directed by Aleksi Salmenperä (episodes 1–4) and Anna Zackrisson (episodes 5–8). White Wall was co-created by Aleksi Salmenperä, Mikko Pöllä and Roope Lehtinen.

Although the story is set to occur in a fictional mining city in Northern Sweden, site of the world's largest nuclear waste depository, the actual main shooting location was Pyhäsalmi Mine and its surroundings in Pyhäjärvi, Finland. White Wall is the most expensive Finnish television series so far (2019) with a budget of seven million Euro.

References

External links
 
  White Wall, Season 1 (in Sweden) at SVT Play.
 White Wall, Season 1 (in Finland) at YLE Areena.

2020 Finnish television series debuts
2020 Swedish television series debuts
2020s Finnish television series
2020s science fiction television series